Uncharacterized protein C14orf80 is a protein which in humans is encoded by the chromosome 14 open reading frame 80, C14orf80, gene.

Gene

Location
C14orf80 is located on chromosome 14 (14q32.33) starting at 105,489,855bp and ending at 105,499,248bp. C14orf80 is 9,393 base pairs long and contains 11 exons that can be alternatively spliced to form different mRNA variants.

Variants
Transcription of C14orf80 can produce 19 mRNA splice variants. Only six of these nineteen variants are predicted to not encode for a protein. Of the mRNA variants that have been found experimentally, the longest is 1,719 base pairs and produces a protein with 426 amino acids.

Expression
C14orf80 has been determined to be expressed in 77 types of tissues and 100 developmental stages. It has also been determined to have a higher level of expression in a few cases of pancreatic and prostate cancer cells compared to normal tissue.

Homology

Paralogs
There are no paralogs of C14orf80.

Orthologs
Using the BLAST program from NCBI, the orthologs of C14orf80 were found to range from primates to invertebrates. Below is a table that contains a variety of these orthologs.

Evolution rate
When compared to the slow-evolving cytochrome C gene and the fast-evolving fibrinogen gene, gene C14orf80 is also fast-evolving.

Protein

General properties
Uncharacterized protein C14orf80 is 426 amino acids long with a molecular weight of 47 kDa. Its isoelectric point is 8.9.

Composition

Secondary structure 
Uncharacterized protein C14orf80 is predicted to be entirely composed of alpha helices. Using the program SOUSI-signal, it was predicted that uncharacterized protein C14orf80 does not contain a signal peptide and is a soluble protein.

Function

Domains
Uncharacterized protein C14orf80 has two functional domains. The first domain is the domain of unknown function 4509 and the second is the domain of unknown function 4510. As their naming states the functions of these domains are still unknown.

DUF4509 is located at amino acid 45 to amino acid 228. In this domain of unknown function there is a conserved WLL sequence motif.

DUF4510 is located at amino acid 263 to amino acid 425. In this domain of unknown function there are two conserved sequence motifs: LEA and WMD.

Post-translational modification
Uncharacterized protein C14orf80 is predicted to have glycation and phosphorylation sites for post-translational modification. Of these sites three are for glycation, eight are for serine phosphorylation and one site is for threonine phosphorylation.

Subcellular location
Uncharacterized protein C14orf80 is not predicted to be a transmembrane protein. It is mainly localized to the golgi apparatus but has been found in the nucleus and cytoplasm also.

Interactions 
Currently, there are 21 proteins that are predicted to interact with uncharacterized protein C14orf80. These 21 proteins were found using the databases Mentha, BioGRID, STRING, GeneCards and IntAct. Below is a table of a variety of these 21 proteins.

Clinical significance
Uncharacterized protein C14orf80 has been associated with tumors in the breast, CNS, endometrium, large intestine, lung, skin, and stomach.

References 

Human proteins